Photoactivated peptides are modified natural or synthetic peptides the functions of which can be activated with light. This can be done either irreversibly or in a reversible way. Caged peptides  which contain photocleavable protecting groups belong to irreversibly activated peptides. Reversible activation/deactivation of peptide function are achieved by incorporation photo-controllable fragments (molecular photoswitches) in the side chains or in the backbone of peptide templates to get the photo-controlled peptides, which can reversibly change their structure upon irradiation with light of different wavelength. As the consequence, the properties, function and biological activity of the modified peptides can be controlled by light. Since light can be directed to specific areas, such peptides can be activated only at targeted sites. Azobenzenes, and diarylethenes can be used as the photoswitches. For therapeutic use, photoswitches with longer wavelengths (near-infrared, to penetrate tissue) or the use of two-photon excitation are required, coupled with improved methods for peptide delivery to live cells.


Applications

Photoactivated peptides are potentially useful for cancer therapy, other light-controlled drugs and in tools to probe molecular interactions in intact cells and whole organisms.

The initial peptides were successfully used to kill B-cell lymphoma cancer cells. The reference synthetic short peptide was alkylated with azobenzene crosslinkers and used to photo-stimulate mitochondrial membrane depolarization and cytochrome c release in permeabilised cells, which were the initial events of the intrinsic apoptosis pathway.
Gramicidin S analogues containing a diarylethene fragment display clear-cut reversible change of antimicrobial activity. In an inactive, UV-inducible photo-form they are harmless to bacteria cells, but are bactericidal after the activation with visible (amber) light.

Photoswitchable peptides to inhibit protein-protein interactions in a light-controlled manner have been developed and applied to inhibit clathrin-mediated endocytosis in mammalian cells and in yeast. The same design principle has been applied to inhibit protein-protein interactions involved in cancer and can be used for any interaction mediated by a helical motif.

See also

 Photochromism
 Azobenzene
 Spiropyran
 Diarylethene
 Photodynamic therapy
 Bcl-2
 Bak (Bcl-2 homologous antagonist killer)
 Bid (BH3 interacting-domain death agonist)
 Luis Moroder, Rudolf K. Allemann

References

Peptides
Experimental cancer treatments